Peba (Peva) is an extinct language from Peba–Yaguan language family once spoken in Peru.

Dialects
Peba dialects are Cauwachi, Caumari, and Pacaya according to Mason (1950).

References 

Extinct languages of South America
Peba–Yaguan languages
Languages of Peru